Shahma was a Palestinian Arab village located  southwest of Ramla. Depopulated on the eve of the 1948 Arab-Israeli war, the village lands today form part of a fenced-in area used by the Israeli Air Force.

Location
During World War II, the British built RAF Aqir military airport just north of the village, Shahma military base lay to the north and east.

History
In 1838,  it was noted as a   Muslim village, in the  Er-Ramleh  District.

In 1852 van de Velde passed by Shammeh, and found two old ponds and "traces of high antiquity" there. He further noted that the village belonged to Sheikh Mosleh, of Bayt Jibrin. In 1863, Victor Guérin noted  the village just after he had passed a group of ruins, which he called Khirbet Merebba.  

It noted 23 houses and 31 persons, though the  population count included men, only.

In 1882, the PEF's Survey of Western Palestine (SWP) described Shahma as a small village built of adobe bricks, whose inhabitants drew their water from a well to the south of the village. On the SWP map drawn by Conder & Kitchener in 1878 the village located southeast of "Yebnah" is called "Shahmeh".

British Mandate era
In the 1922 census of Palestine conducted by the British Mandate authorities, Shameh  had a population of 107 inhabitants, all  Muslims,  increasing in the 1931 census to 150, still all Muslims, in a total of 34 houses.

The village was classified as a hamlet by the Palestine Index Gazetteer.  It  was divided into two sections, north and south of a secondary road. Some of its houses were built in part with stone remains from previous settlements.

In the  1945 statistics  the village had a population of 280, all Muslims with a total of 6,875 dunums of land. A total of 152 dunums of village land was used for citrus and bananas, 4,911 dunums were used for cereals,  33 dunums were irrigated or used for orchards,  while 11 dunams were classified as built-up public areas.

1948, and aftermath
The Palestinian historian Walid Khalidi described the place in 1992: "The site has been incorporated into a fenced-in military airfield. It is marked by cactuses and bushes that are visible from the outside."

See also
Depopulated Palestinian locations in Israel

References

Bibliography

External links
Welcome To Shahma
Shahma,  Zochrot
Survey of Western Palestine, Map 16:   IAA, Wikimedia commons  
Shama from Khalil Sakakini Cultural Center

Arab villages depopulated prior to the 1948 Arab–Israeli War